Ed Pryor (1903 – death date unknown) was an American Negro league second baseman in the 1920s.

A native of Texas, Pryor played for the Lincoln Giants in 1925. In 16 recorded games, he posted ten hits in 67 plate appearances.

References

External links
 and Seamheads

1903 births
Date of birth missing
Year of death missing
Place of birth missing
Place of death missing
Lincoln Giants players
Baseball second basemen
Baseball players from Texas